Stepanivka is an urban-type settlement in Sumy Raion of Sumy Oblast in Ukraine. It is located on the left bank of the Sumka, a right tributary of the Psel, in the drainage basin of the Dnieper. Stepanivka hosts the administration of Stepanivka settlement hromada, one of the hromadas of Ukraine. Population:

Economy

Transportation
Toropylivka railway station is located in the settlement, on the railway connecting Vorozhba with Kharkiv via Sumy. There is infrequent passenger traffic.

Stepanivka has road access to Sumy and to Konotop via Terny.

References

Urban-type settlements in Sumy Raion